Vodou art may refer to:
 Haitian Vodou art, associated with the Vodou religion of Haiti
 Vodun art, associated with the Vodon religion of West Africa